The canton of Dormans-Paysages de Champagne is an administrative division of the Marne department, northeastern France. It was created at the French canton reorganisation which came into effect in March 2015. Its seat is in Dormans.

It consists of the following communes:
 
Anthenay
Aougny
Le Baizil
Bannay
Baslieux-sous-Châtillon
Baye
Beaunay
Belval-sous-Châtillon
Bligny
Boursault
Le Breuil
Brouillet
La Caure
Chambrecy
Champaubert
Champlat-et-Boujacourt
Champvoisy
La Chapelle-sous-Orbais
Châtillon-sur-Marne
Chaumuzy
Cœur-de-la-Vallée
Coizard-Joches
Congy
Cormoyeux
Corribert
Courjeonnet
Courthiézy
Cuchery
Cuisles
Damery
Dormans
Étoges
Fèrebrianges
Festigny
Fleury-la-Rivière
Igny-Comblizy
Jonquery
Lagery
Leuvrigny
Lhéry
Mareuil-en-Brie
Mareuil-le-Port
Marfaux
Margny
Montmort-Lucy
Nesle-le-Repons
La Neuville-aux-Larris
Œuilly
Olizy
Orbais-l'Abbaye
Passy-Grigny
Poilly
Pourcy
Romery
Romigny
Sainte-Gemme
Saint-Martin-d'Ablois
Sarcy
Suizy-le-Franc
Talus-Saint-Prix
Tramery
Troissy
Vandières
Vauciennes
Venteuil
Verneuil
Ville-en-Tardenois
La Ville-sous-Orbais
Villevenard
Vincelles

References

Cantons of Marne (department)